Dhaka FM is a Bengali-language FM radio station in Dhaka, Bangladesh. DhakaFM began broadcasting on 1 January 2012.  Dhaka FM is 24-hour broadcast radio station running 19+ hours of live programs.

Frequent programs
Shows like Wake Up Bangladesh, Canteen 90.4, My City My Tune, Be Cool and Flight Number 904 air 6 days a week from Saturday beginning at 8 am.

Special popular shows
These shows are aired once a week
 Ondhokarer Golpo
 Account No 90.4
 Bhalobashar Diary with Guru Ehtesham
 Akash Choyar Golpo
 Bhalobashar Bangladesh with Guru Ehtesham
 Therapy
 FM Dosti with FM Guru Ehtesham
 Cut Uncut
 Super Tunes
 Rongin Dhaka
 Music Buzz
Jibon Golpo with RJ Kebria
Secrets with RJ Kebria

Technical facts
Frequency: 90.4 MHz

Capacity: 10KW

Antenna gain: 6 dB

Polarization: Circular (8 bay)

Data service: RDS and DARC transmission

References

External links
 
 

Radio stations in Bangladesh
Radio stations established in 2012
Mass media in Dhaka